Queens Hall was a concert and exhibition venue located in Leeds, West Yorkshire, England. It was originally a tram and then a bus depot and had latterly become a venue hosting events such as the Ideal Home Exhibition and the 1981, 1982, 1988 and 1989 Great British Beer Festival, flea markets, travelling fairs and concerts.

History

The building was originally constructed at the turn of the 20th century and was known as Swinegate Tram Depot. The hall was refurbished as a music venue in 1961 and was a popular venue amongst students and the townspeople of Leeds with a capacity for 5,000 people. The very first event to be held there was the Yorkshire Ideal Home & Food Exhibition (5–20 May 1961), sponsored by The Yorkshire Post.

Over the years the Queens Hall had been as a venue for popular music. Motörhead complained about the acoustics, and it was uncomfortably cold in winter, with ice forming on the retained tramlines. As far back as the 1980s there was talk of an arena for Leeds and by that time the Queens Hall was in need of extensive modernisation to bring it up to an acceptable standard. The Queens Hall was demolished in 1989 and the site is now mostly used as a surface level car park with redevelopment taking place on part of the site for a multi-storey car park with ground floor restaurant and an office building for BT. Construction work to add two additional storeys to the Criterion Place multi-storey car park began in July 2008.

The Leeds Arena, opened in 2013, became a new concert venue in Leeds.

Redevelopment
Proposals for the redevelopment of the rest of the former Queens Hall site have been ongoing since the 1990s with failed proposals including those from 1995 for an office building designed by Norman Foster for Royal London Insurance and a latter proposal in 2004 for two skyscrapers to be named Criterion Place designed by SimpsonHaugh and Partners to be developed by Simons Estates. Neither of these proposals went to fruition but plans to complete the redevelopment of the former Queens Hall site were realised in 2015 when new business premises called Sovereign Square were built on the site.

Performers
Bands and musicians to have performed at the Queens Hall have included the following acts:

 AC/DC
 Acker Bilk
 Bryan Adams
 Otis Redding
 Def Leppard
 Duran Duran
 Elton John
 Genesis
 Japan
 Joy Division
 Motörhead
 Ozzy Osbourne
 Pink Floyd
 Roxy Music
 Rush
 Tank
 T'Pau
 The Beatles
 The Clash
 The Damned
 The Faces
 The Jacksons
 The Jam
 The Police
 The Rolling Stones
 The Who
 Thin Lizzy
 UB40
 Raven
 Saxon / Twisted Sister / Girlschool / Spider / Battleaxe All Day Festival 1983
 Saxon (1981 and 1984)
 Kiss
 Dio
 Wet Wet Wet
 Wham!
 Futurama Festival (1979, 1980 and 1983)

See also
 Leeds Corporation Tramways

References

External links

 Secret Leeds thread on the Leeds Queens Hall
Queens Hall at the Leodis photographic archive

Exhibition and conference centres in England
Music venues in Leeds
Buildings and structures in Leeds
Buildings and structures demolished in 1989
Demolished buildings and structures in England
Redevelopment projects in the United Kingdom